Assiniboine Park Zoo is an  zoo at the west end of Assiniboine Park in Winnipeg, Manitoba, Canada. It has been best known for decades for its polar bear exhibit, of which the old enclosure was replaced in 2013 with Journey to Churchill.

Established in 1904, it is managed by the Assiniboine Park Conservancy, and accredited by the Canadian Association of Zoos and Aquariums (CAZA) and the Association of Zoos and Aquariums (AZA).

History

Early years 
In 1904, the City of Winnipeg Parks Board purchased some native animals including deer, bison, and elk to start the zoo. In 1908, the bear enclosure was built, and by 1909, the zoo had 116 animals of 19 species.

In 1916, the zoo budget was $8,000 ($1,800 for food, $4,200 for labour, and $1,158 for new construction). Two decades later, the zoo got its first lion, a female, in 1935; and its first polar bear, a wild, orphaned cub named Carmichael, in 1939. Carmichael got a partner in February 1940—a female named Clementine.

The Zoological Society of Manitoba was formed in 1956 to provide the vision and funding for the zoo. In 1957, the zoo helped develop "Aunt Sally's Farm", a children's petting zoo named after Sally Warnock. A scale model had been presented in February 1958, and the petting zoo officially opened on Friday, 7 August 1959. At first, an admission fee was charged: 10 cents for children over 5 years old, and 25 cents for adults. The fee was dropped years later.

1960s–1990s 
In 1959, the zoo was officially named Assiniboine Park Zoo.

In the 1960s, the gibbon/monkey house was built, another orphan polar bear cub arrived at the zoo, and a snow leopard was added to the zoo. The polar bear enclosure was renovated in 1967, adding an upper story, and two more orphaned cubs arrived. Subsequently, in 1968 and 1969, the Tropical House, Native Animal Exhibit, and a new south gate were added.

In the 1980s, the Zoological Society of Manitoba, which had not been active for a while, began to provide money for new signage, exhibits, and infrastructure. The main entrance was reconstructed to include a new gift store operated by the Zoological Society, and the Carousel Restaurant was renovated.

New enclosures for the camels, yaks, and zebras, as well as the "Camel Oasis" Interpretive Playground, opened in the northwest end of the zoo in 1995. This was also the first year for "Lights of the Wild," featuring animal light sculptures presented by the Zoo and the Society for 3 weeks in the winter.

In 1997, the "Saturn Playground" was constructed and the main restaurant facilities were renovated. The Saturn Shuttle and Kiosk information booth projects were established in 1998, as well as an upgrade to the electrical infrastructure of the Zoo. By 1998, the Zoo's animal collection had increased to include 77 different mammal species (390 animals), 151 different birds (700 specimens), and 14 reptiles (34 specimens), with the total collection including about 1,193 individuals of 271 species; the zoo budget was $2,497,173 ($161,800 for food and supplies, and $1,952,707 for labour).

2000s 
As late as 2000, the Zoo was open from 9am till sunset (or 9pm). However, later the Zoo's hours were significantly reduced. In July 2015, the Zoo extended visiting hours every Wednesday till 8pm as a trial, because there were many requests from zoo visitors that the earlier closing was not convenient for people who work during the day.

In 2000, the Zoological Society of Manitoba and the Zoo started work on a new Master Plan Development Proposal (the first since 1960) for the Zoo. Initial proposals were for the redesign of the existing Polar Bear enclosure, but this eventually grew into a much larger Master Plan Development project. In 2008, the Assiniboine Park Conservancy was created to develop, govern, and manage Assiniboine Park, including the Zoo. In June 2009, the Assiniboine Park Conservancy unveiled a comprehensive $200-million redevelopment plan for Assiniboine Park & Zoo that was to be completed over 10 years.

In 2001, a grant from the DeFehr Foundation funded the renovation of the unused Bison Restaurant Kiosk into the Palliser Interpretive Center, the headquarters for ICE Camp. An alliance with the University of Manitoba Summer Camps initiates "Mini U Zoo," where campers spend one week at the University and one week at the Zoo.

In 2004, as part of  venture with the University of Manitoba Architecture Department, substantial improvements were made to the Education Centre.

In 2009, the Assiniboine Park Conservancy announced a redevelopment plan for both the Assiniboine Park and Zoo, to be completed in several phases. Revitalization of the Zoo was involved in the plan's second phase, with its flagship being the opening of the Journey to Churchill exhibit.

In September 2014, the Assiniboine Park Zoo becomes one of only five Canadian zoos to be accredited by the Association of Zoos & Aquariums.

Incidents 
 In July 2014, the wolves and polar bears had to be taken out of their display areas because one or more of the wolves dug their way into the polar bear enclosure. No one was hurt in the incident.
 Safety protocols were in question when one Amur (Siberian) tiger gained access to another enclosure and killed another tiger in September 2014.
 In November 2014, a seal got trapped in a drain and died.
 In January 2019, a five-year-old polar bear "Blizzard" had died of fluid in its chest (supposedly pneumonia).

Exhibits and facilities

Animals of Asia 
The Animals of Asia section of the Zoo contains various rare and exotic animal species, including:

 Mammals
 Arabian Camel (Camelus dromedarius)
 Domestic Bactrian Camel (Camelus bactrianus domestic)
 Sichuan Takin (Budorcas taxicolor tibetana)
 Reindeer (Rangifer tarandus)
 Domestic Yak (Bos grunniens)
 Turkmenian Markhor (Capra falconeri heptneri)
 White-handed (Lar) Gibbon (Hylobates lar)
 Snow Leopard (Panthera uncia)
 Amur Tiger (Panthera tigris altaica) — two endangered Amur (Siberian) tigers, one female and one male
 Birds
 Steller’s Sea Eagle (Haliaeetus pelagicus)
 Emu (Dromaius novaehollandiae) from Australia

The exhibit was opened in June 2010 as the Pavilion of Lions, with a pair of African lions becoming the exhibits first residents. In April 2012, the African lions were replaced with Asiatic lions in the Pavilion of Lions exhibit, making the Assiniboine Park Zoo the very first facility in North America to house a pair of Asiatic lions. In 2013, a new  expansion of the enclosure for Siberian tigers was constructed and opened. The new enclosure would assist the breeding program.

Aunt Sally's Farm 
Aunt Sally's Farm is a child-friendly learn-and-play area of the zoo, which includes a wishing well and sits parallel to a playground.

Unlike the current exhibit, the old Aunt Sally's Farm was a petting zoo which operated between 1959 and 1989. It was replaced by the Kinsman Discovery Centre, which opened on 23 March 1990.

The current farm includes the following mammals:

 American miniature horse (Equus caballus)
 Kiko goat (Capra hircus)
 Llama (Lama glama)
 Nubian goat (Capra hircus)
 Pygmy goat (Capra hircus)
 Sardinian miniature donkey (Equus asinus domestic)
 Vietnamese pot-bellied pig (Sus scrofa)

Grasslands and Boreal Forest 
The Grasslands & Boreal Forest section features animal species that are native to North America.

After Journey to Churchill opened in 2014, it was thought that a wolf exhibit would be nice addition to the Zoo. (Though originally a wolf exhibit was not planned for.) The Grasslands & Boreal Forest exhibit opened in June 2018 and features four male grey wolves and one female grey wolf.

, species contained at the Grasslands & Boreal Forest include:

 Mammals
 American bison (Bison bison)
 American elk (Cervus canadensis)
 Arctic fox (Alopex lagopus)
 Canadian lynx (Lynx canadensis)
 Cougar (Puma concolor)
 Grey Wolf (Canis lupus)
 Red fox (Vulpes vulpes)
 Stone's sheep (Ovis dalli stonei)
 Striped skunk (Mephitis mephitis)
 Turkmenian markhor (Capra falconeri heptneri)
 White-tailed deer (Odocoileus virginianus)

 Birds
 American white pelican (Pelecanus erythrorhynchos)
 Burrowing owl (Athene cunicularia)
 Greater white-fronted goose (Anser albifrons)
 Sandhill crane (Grus canadensis)
 Snow goose (Anser caerulescens)
 Snowy owl (Nyctea scandiaca)

Journey to Churchill 

Journey to Churchill is an exhibit representing various habitats of northern Manitoba, and is the most comprehensive northern species exhibit of its kind in the world. (The town of Churchill, on the Hudson Bay in northern Manitoba, is home to the largest polar-bear denning area in the world.) The exhibit features expansive habitats for:

 Arctic foxes (Alopex lagopus)
 Harbor (Common) Seal (Phoca vitulina)
 Muskoxen (Ovibos moschatus)
 Polar bear (Ursus maritimus)
 Reindeer (Rangifer tarandus)
 Snowy owls (Nyctea scandiaca)

The exhibit also features Gateway to the Arctic, which includes: an underwater viewing tunnels, called Sea Ice Passage, that house polar bears and seals, who are separated by a clear wall; a short-film experience inside the 360-degree Aurora Borealis Theatre; and other interactive interpretive components.

Inside the Journey to Churchill exhibit is also the Leatherdale International Polar Bear Conservation Centre (IPBCC), an interpretive centre sponsored by Calm Air that offers information regarding polar bears, the Arctic ecosystem, research in action, climate change, etc. Also located inside the Journey to Churchill exhibit, the Tundra Grill is a 150-seat restaurant with views of the largest of three polar-bear habitats in the exhibit.

The International Polar Bear Conservation Centre was opened in January 2012, followed by the Journey to Churchill Northern Species exhibit in July 2014 as a permanent area.

Kinsmen Discovery Centre 
The Kinsmen Discovery Centre contains six galleries pertaining to different life forms—water, grasslands, air, underground, and two forest galleries—and is the Zoo's 2nd-biggest indoor exhibit with fish, snakes, reptiles, etc.

Announced in November 1986, and originally planned to open in the fall of 1987, the Centre broke ground in June 1988. Costing $1.75 million, the  Kinsman Discovery Centre opened on 23 March 1990, two and a half years late and $550,000 over budget. It replaced the old Aunt Sally's Farm, which operated between 1959 and 1989. 

A statue honouring Winnipeg the Bear—the bear that was made famous as Winnie-the-Pooh—was unveiled in 1992 and has since been relocated to the Nature Playground, in the general Park area.

, species contained at the Kinsmen Discovery Centre include:

 Crustaceans and Insects
 Anemone
 Bubble-tip anemone (Entacmaea quadricolor) 
 Pink-tipped anemone (Condylactis) 
 Central American giant cave cockroach (Blaberus giganteus)
 Crabs
 Emerald crab (Mithraculus sculptus)
 Red Reef hermit crab (Paguristes cadenati)
 Thinstripe hermit crab (Clibanarius vittatus)
 Tricolor hermit crab (Clibanarius tricolor)
 Emerald false (shaggy mushroom) coral (Ricordea florida)
 Shrimp
 Banded coral shrimp (Stenopus hispidus)
 Peppermint shrimp (Lysmata wurdemanni)
 Snails
 Antillean tooth snail (Nerita)
 Channeled turban snail (Turbo) 
 Crowned astrea snail (Astraea) 
 Middle-spined cerith snail (Cerithium) 
 Nassarius snail (Nassarius) 
 Turban snail (Turbo fluctuosus) 
 Zebra nerite snail (Neritina natalensis)
 Fish
 Banded archerfish (Toxotes jaculatrix)
 Bristle-nosed pleco (Ancistrus)
 Catfish
 Blotched upside-down catfish (Synodontis nigriventris)
 Featherfin squeaker catfish (Synodontis eupterus)
 Dottybacks
 Dottyback (Pseudochromidae) 
 Orchid dottyback (Pseudochromis fridmani) 
 Gilled African lungfish (Protopterus amphibius)
 Leopard bush fish (Ctenopoma acutirostre)
 Mexican blind cave fish (Astyanax jordani)  
 Saddled bichir (Polypterus endlicheri)
 Tomini surgeon (Ctenochaetus tominiensis)
 Tangs
 Blue regal (hippo) tang (Paracanthurus hepatus) 
 Purple (Yellow-tailed) tang (Zebrasoma xanthurum) 
 Yellow tang (Zebrasoma flavescens)

 Reptiles and Amphibians
 Geyr’s spiny-tailed lizard (Uromastyx geyri)
 New Caledonia Bumpy (Gargoyle) Gecko (Rhacodactylus auriculatus) 
 Solomon Island (Prehensile-tailed) Skink (Corucia zebrata)
 Tortoises
 Indian star tortoise (Geochelone elegans)
 Red-footed tortoise (Chelonoidis carbonarius)
 South American yellow-footed tortoise (Geochelone denticulata)
 White’s Tree (Dunny) Frog (Pelodryas caerulea) 

 Birds
 Common bulbul (Pycnonotus barbatus)
 Doves
 Black-naped fruit dove (Ptilinopus melanospilus)
 Common emerald dove (Chalcophaps indica)
 Mourning dove (Zenaida macroura) 
 Tawny frogmouth (Podargus strigoides)
 Snowy-headed robin-chat (Cossypha niveicapilla)
 Speckled mousebird (Colius striatus) 
 Violet-backed (amethyst) starling (Cinnyricinclus leucogaster) 
 Weavers
 Village weaver (Ploceus cucullatus)
 Taveta golden weaver (Ploceus castaneiceps) 

 Mammals
 Greater spear-nosed bat (Phyllostomus hastatus)
 Prevost's squirrel (Callosciurus prevostii)
 Slender-tailed meerkat (Suricata suricatta)

Open Range 
The Open Range section is located at the center of the Zoo and features various animals from around the world, including:

 Mammals
 Alpine ibex (Capra ibex)
 Llama (Lama glama)
 Pronghorn (Antilocapra americana)
 Red kangaroo (Macropus rufus)
 Turkmenian markhor (Capra falconeri heptneri)

 Birds
 Common peafowl (Pavo cristatus) — free roaming
 Demoiselle crane (Anthropoides virgo)
 Wild turkey (Meleagris gallopavo) — free roaming

Toucan Ridge 
Toucan Ridge, originally known as the Tropical House, is an exhibit featuring animal, bird, and plant life of the new-world tropics of Central and South America.

Constructed in 1971 at a cost of $500,000, the original  Tropical House building first opened to the public in November 1972 and almost doubled the Zoo's total species. Temperatures inside the Tropical House would be maintained at a constant .

In 2009, the Zoo contracted with demolition company Klassen Concrete to demolish the early 1970s Tropical House. Instead of demolishing the building, a plan was put into place where most of the building would be reused but the displays would be reconfigured. The project took five months to complete, with infrastructure renewal costing $900,000, and exhibit renewal costing $2.1 million.

On 20 April 2011, the first new exhibit as part of the Assiniboine Park Zoo's redevelopment plans, Toucan Ridge, was opened.

, species contained at the Toucan Ridge include:

 Mammals
 Common squirrel monkey (Saimiri sciureus)
 Cotton-top tamarin (Saguinus oedipus)
 Goeldi's monkey (Callimico goeldii)
 Kinkajou (Potos flavus)
 Ocelot (Leopardus pardalis)
 Patagonian mara (Dolichotis patagonum)
 Red panda (Ailurus fulgens refulgens)
 Seba’s short-tailed bat (Carollia perspicillata)
 Birds
 Blue-throated piping guan (Pipile cumanensis)
 Cinnamon teal (Spatula cyanoptera)
 Golden eagle (Aquila chrysaetos)
 Monk parakeet (Myiopsitta monachus)
 Peruvian thick-knee (Burhinus superciliaris)
 Red-crested wood partridge (Rollulus rouloul)
 Red-winged parrot (Aprosmictus erythropterus)
 Ringed teal (Callonetta leucophrys)
 Roseate spoonbill (Platalea ajaja)
 Scarlet ibis (Eudocimus ruber)
 Sulphur-crested cockatoo (Cacatua galerita)
 Sun Conure (Aratinga solstitialis)
 Sunbittern (Eurypyga helias)
 Toco toucan (Ramphastos toco)
 Yellow-green grosbeak (Caryothraustes canadensis)

 Reptiles and Amphibians
 Axolotl (Ambystoma mexicanum)
 Cuvier's dwarf caiman (Paleosuchus palpebrosus)
 Green-and-black poison dart frog (Dendrobates auratus)
 Panther Chameleon (Furcifer pardalis)
 Yellow-and-blue poison dart frog (Dendrobates tinctorius)
 Yellow-spotted Amazon river turtle (Podocnemis unifilis)
 Common Boa Constrictor

 Fish
 Convict cichlid (Archocentrus nigrofasciata)

Others 
Dinosaurs Uncovered is an interactive dinosaur exhibit that opens during the summer. Outdoors, it features 17 life-size, animatronic dinosaurs along a forested trail; indoors, it features dinosaur skeletons, fossils, and artifacts. It consists of species from the Triassic, Jurassic, and Cretaceous periods, and includes the Tyrannosaurus Rex and the feathered Dakotaraptor.

The McFeetors Heavy Horse Centre is a year-round exhibit that is currently home to two breeds of horses (Equus caballus)—Percheron draft horse and Clydesdale draft horse—and includes a barn, pastures, paddocks, and a carriage shed. Covering , the Centre was announced in September 2014 and officially opened on 28 August 2015.

The Shirley Richardson Butterfly Garden, located next to the Toucan Ridge exhibit, is a permanent seasonal exhibit of various butterfly species, and is open from late spring to early fall.

Events 
Major community events take place annually in both the Zoo and Park. , events held at the Zoo include the following:

 Brew at the Zoo is an event showcasing Manitoba's local craft beer, wine, and spirits industry.
 Wildest Dreams is a Zoo experience offered to families "facing health and/or socio-economic barriers."
 The Zoo Lights Festival is the holiday light show that takes place between the late fall and early winter months, being held since 2019.

Former exhibits and events 
A special Australian exhibit featuring koalas from the San Diego Zoo was created in 1993, and was open to the public between May 12 and September 19, in the former Aunt Sally's Farm space. After the koalas left, this enclosure was used for Matschie's tree-kangaroos.

Boo at the Zoo was started in 1996 as a Halloween event. In the first year, 40,000 people attended over a ten-day period. By its 10th anniversary in 2006, when the Pumpkin Patch Maze, Area 54 and Boo Alley were added to the attractions, the event was attended by 57,400 visitors.

Lights of the Wild, featuring animal light sculptures presented by the Zoo and the Society, was first opened in 1996 for 3 weeks in the winter. It was discontinued in 2000 and the lights were all sold to Portage Island of Lights.

Stingray Beach was a rotating exhibit that debuted in 2019 on the May long weekend. However, after a month and a half, three male specimens died from undetermined causes.

A temporary exhibit, Xtreme Bugs, was featured at the Zoo during the summer of 2018.

Operations 
The Zoo hosts summertime day camps for children of all ages, as well as guided school and group tours.

Conservation and research 
Located inside the Journey to Churchill exhibit, the Leatherdale International Polar Bear Conservation Centre (IPBCC), named after Doug and Louise Leatherdale and sponsored by Calm Air, is the Zoo's central hub for research projects and conservation, as well as an interpretive centre providing wildlife education. Opened in 2012, it was established with funding from the Government of Manitoba as part of the provincial Polar Bear Protection Amendment Act, and houses the Conservation and Research department of Assiniboine Park Conservancy. IPBCC is overseen by an advisory board, currently chaired by Dr. Stephen Petersen, who is also the Zoo's Director of Conservation and Research.

The Zoo's conservation efforts are focused in three areas: arctic and subarctic species conservation; Manitoba species conservation; and conservation of international species at risk.

Current (as of 2021) projects relating to arctic and subarctic species conservation include: a study mapping out denning areas of polar bears; the studying of polar-bear biology through non-invasive techniques; a collaborative project with researchers at the University of Manitoba into the technologies that enable the identification of individual polar bears; a project collecting and classifying underwater images of beluga whales in the Churchill River, in partnership with Polar Bears International, Zooniverse, and Explore.org, and support by the RBC Foundation; and a project (sponsored by Calm Air) monitoring the response of ringed and harbour seal in the Hudson Bay to changes in sea ice.

Current (as of 2021) projects relating to Manitoba species conservation include: a headstarting program, initiated in 2017, for Poweshiek skipperling; a project involving the recovery of burrowing owls; and the Saving Animals From Extinction (SAFE) project, currently involved in saving the monarch butterfly and North-American songbird.

Admission fees 
Since its inception, the Zoo had been free. Various attempts at raising funds (beyond taxpayer funds) had been tried, including coin boxes inside the Zoo, a gift shop. By 1993 it was decided to start charging an admission fee for zoo maintenance, and upgrading/expansion of exhibit spaces.

In 2015, the Zoo had offered discount Tuesdays at the cost of $10 for adults. However in that year the admission fee was raised to $12 per adult.

The Zoo has offered free children's admission during the days of the Christmas Break in years 2015, (2016?), 2017, and 2018.

References

External links

Zoos in Canada
Tourist attractions in Winnipeg
Tuxedo, Winnipeg